Kurios is a Cirque du Soleil touring production which premiered on April 24, 2014, in Montreal, Quebec, Canada under the full title of Kurios: Cabinet of Curiosities. Created and directed by Michel Laprise, it looks at a late 19th-century world inventor who invents a machine that defies the laws of time, space, and dimension. As he reinvents everything around him with steampunk elements, he is joined by characters from another dimension who interact with him.

Acts
Acts currently in the show include:
 Chaos synchro
 Russian cradle
 Aerial bicycle
 Contortion
 Balancing on chairs
 Rola bola
 Acro net
 Aerial straps
 Yo-yo
 Banquine

Retired acts and acts in rotation include:
 Handbalancing
 Aerial cart
 Chinese pole

Music
The score, composed by Raphaël Beau in collaboration with Guy Dubuc and Marc Lessard (known as Bob and Bill), fuses jazz with electro swing.

The soundtrack was released on December 9, 2014. A CD launch, "Kurios about Music", took place at the December 10, 2014, show, which included an off-stage performance by the Kurios band and an after-show party.

Track titles
 "11h11" (Opening)
 "Steampunk Telegram" (Aerial Bike)
 "Bella Donna Twist" (Chaos Synchro 1900)
 "Gravity Levitas" (Russian Cradle)
 "Monde inversé" (Upside Down World)
 "Hypnotique" (Contortion)
 "Departure" (Theater of hands/Transition into Rola Bola)
 "Fearsome Flight" (Rola Bola)
 "Clouds" (Acro Net)
 "Créature de siam" (Aerial Straps Duo)
 "Wat U No Wen" (Banquine)
 "You Must be Joking" (Finale)

Vocalists
 Eirini Tornesaki - from April 24, 2014, to March 19, 2017
 Sophie Guay - from March 19, 2017, to present

Critical reception
The Toronto Star praised the show and critic Richard Ouzounian, saying "Kurios is Cirque du Soleil's strongest act in years." The Gazette also declared Kurios a success, saying it was "...a classic. It runs like clockwork and could tick on forever." The Globe and Mail described it as a "kinetic, whimsical and astounding new production".

On the show's debut in San Francisco, the San Francisco Chronicle called Kurios "the best Cirque du Soleil show in a long time". The San Jose Mercury News wrote, "For its 30th anniversary, Cirque du Soleil has concocted a dark and mysterious world that eschews the brightly colored eye candy for which the French Canadian juggernaut has become famous."

Chris Jones of the Chicago Tribune wrote: "Well, the Cirque has come roaring back with a dazzling, hyper-detailed, potent, quixotic and generally fantastic show that reveals this extraordinary artistic company's singular capacity for exploration and metamorphosis. It is not to be missed on any account. Even the music, sung by the Greek vocalist Eirini Tornesaki, is beguiling."

References

External links
 

Cirque du Soleil touring shows